The Kyabram Football Netball Club, nicknamed the Bombers, is an Australian rules football and netball club based in the town of Kyabram, Victoria. The club teams currently compete in the Goulburn Valley Football League (GVFL).

Kyabram was a foundation club in the Goulburn Valley Football League (GVFL) and has been one of the most dominant. Only the Shepparton Football Club have won more premierships.

The club had a successful era the 1920s, when they won five GVFL premierships, including the Kyabram Reserves winning the senior football premiership in the Northern Goulburn Football Association in 1929.

The club has produced many VFL/AFL footballers, including Ross Dillon, Garry Lyon and Brett Deledio. Kyabram's Chris Stuhldreier won the GVFL goal-kicking every season from 1991 to 1994, including a record setting 164 goals in 1993.

Between 2016 and 2018 the club won an astounding 62 wins in a row. The sequence stopped at the 2018 Grand Final.  The club was undefeated in 2019.

Football Premierships
Seniors

Reference:

GVFL – Morrison Medal winners
J Cooper (1958, 1961)
C Stewart (1963)
Dick Clay (1964)?
P Gittos (1987)
B Gugliotti (1993)
Reference:

VFL / AFL Players
The following footballers played with Kyabram prior to playing senior VFL / AFL football, with the year indicating their debut season.
 1904 – Tom Hawkins: South Melbourne
 1914 – Charlie Fisher: Carlton
 1919 – George Parkinson: Richmond
 1920 – Billy James: Richmond
 1920 – Roy Outram: Collingwood & Richmond
 1925 – Percy Outram: Carlton
 1955 – Peter Aitken: Carlton
 1959 – Cliff Deacon: South Melbourne
 1960 – Ian Howard: Footscray
 1961 – Barry Bryant: Carlton
 1961 – Graeme Haslem: Hawthorn
 1965 – Bryan Pleitner: Footscray
 1966 – Dick Clay: Richmond
 1966 – Ross Dillon: Melbourne
 1966 – Frank Fanning: Footscray
 1966 – Maurie Fowler: Carlton
 1969 – Paul Rowlands: Melbourne
 1973 – Shane Fitzsimmons: Melbourne
 1975 – Colin Graham: Melbourne
 1975 – John Sparks: Melbourne
 1976 – Maurice Wingate: Melbourne
 1979 – Kelly O'Donnell: Melbourne
 1982 – Trevor Castles: Melbourne
 1982 – Stuart McKenzie: Melbourne
 1985 – Daryl Bourke: Melbourne
 1986 – Gary Lyon: Melbourne
 1987 – Bradley Sparks: Melbourne
 1995 – Glen Coghlan: St. Kilda
 2001 – Kayne Pettifer: Richmond
 2005 – Brett Deledio: Richmond
 2014 – Nick Holman: Carlton & Gold Coast Suns

References

External links

 Twitter page
 Facebook page
 SportsTG site

Australian rules football clubs in Victoria (Australia)
Goulburn Valley Football League clubs
Netball teams in Victoria (Australia)